Kim Senklip Harvey is a Canadian actress, playwright and director. She is most noted for her play Kamloopa: An Indigenous Matriarch Story, which won the Governor General's Award for English-language drama at the 2020 Governor General's Awards.

Harvey is Syilx and Tsilhqot’in with ancestral ties to the Dakelh, Secwepemc and Ktunaxa communities, she is a graduate of the theatre program at the University of British Columbia. She had stage roles for a while after graduating, but found herself burning out due to always having to play negative portrayals of indigenous women as victims, and left the theatre for some time to work as an advocate for indigenous children in foster care. She returned to theatre in 2017, writing Kamloopa with the goal of presenting a more balanced view of the strength of indigenous women.

References

21st-century Canadian actresses
21st-century Canadian dramatists and playwrights
21st-century Canadian women writers
21st-century First Nations writers
Canadian stage actresses
Canadian women dramatists and playwrights
First Nations dramatists and playwrights
First Nations actresses
First Nations women writers
Writers from British Columbia
University of British Columbia alumni
Living people
Syilx people
Tsilhqot'in people
Ktunaxa people
Dakelh people
Year of birth missing (living people)
Governor General's Award-winning dramatists